Derek Harker (born January 7, 1951) is a Canadian former professional ice hockey defenceman. After three years in junior hockey with the Edmonton Oil Kings, he was selected by the St. Louis Blues in the fourth round (52nd overall) of the 1971 NHL Amateur Draft.

Harker played the majority of his professional career with teams in the minor leagues (EHL, CHL, IHL, SHL, NAHL). 

During the inaugural 1972–73 season of the World Hockey Association, Harker played 28 games in that major leagueone with the Alberta Oilers and 27 with the Philadelphia Blazers.

References

External links

1951 births
Buffalo Norsemen players
Canadian ice hockey defencemen
Edmonton Oil Kings (WCHL) players
Edmonton Oilers (WHA) players
Flint Generals players
Hampton Gulls (SHL) players
Kansas City Blues players
Living people
Long Island Ducks (ice hockey) players
Philadelphia Blazers players
Port Huron Wings players
Roanoke Valley Rebels (EHL) players
Ice hockey people from Edmonton
St. Louis Blues draft picks
Tidewater Sharks players
Winston-Salem Polar Twins (SHL) players